Ang Mo Kio Secondary School (AMKSS) is a co-educational government secondary school in Ang Mo Kio, Singapore, offering education for Secondary 1 to Secondary 5. Students at AMKSS are known as AMKsians.

History
The school was the first school to be built in Ang Mo Kio. It officially started functioning on 2 January 1979 in the premises of Hwi Yoh Secondary School with 12 Secondary One classes. On 12 July that year, the school occupied its premises at Ang Mo Kio Street 22 and was officially declared open on 20 September 1980 by Yeo Toon Chia, the Member of Parliament for Ang Mo Kio Constituency. It was located along that road, in a new building that was built at a cost of S$4.29 million, and started upper secondary classes the next year. In December 1999, the school temporarily relocated to Hougang Street 93. In 2002, the school returned to Ang Mo Kio Street 22. The school was headed by the pioneer Principal, Tan Joo Kheng, followed by Monica Quek Swee Imm, Tan Guat Kim, Doreen Yip, Paramita Bandara, Tan Swee Piang, Tan Chee Siong, Abdul Mannan and Tom Chan. Since 15 Dec 2017, Shaw Swee Tat took over the school as Principal

In December 1999, it moved to temporary premises at Hougang Street 93 to enable rebuilding on the former site. From January 2002, Ang Mo Kio Secondary School started operating at its newly built premises in Ang Mo Kio Street 22. The new building was declared open on 13 July that year by Seng Han Thong, Member of Parliament for Ang Mo Kio GRC.

School Identity & Culture

Motto 
Always Strive For The Best

Discipline
Behavioural standards are maintained through a merit/demerit points system. Students who commit major offences may be punished by detention, caning (for boys only) or suspension, in addition to receiving counselling and being placed under the Student Reformative Programme for a period of time as stipulated by the Discipline Committee. There is also a Peer Mediation Programme for the resolution of disputes.

Events 
Biannually, the school puts on its NOMAD (Night Of Music And Dance) festival, whose origins lie in the AMKSS Integrated Arts Programme (IAP) for all Secondary 1 and 2 students. It was established in 2003 to encourage an exploration of the arts, and allows students to work with practising artists in music, visual arts, dance and drama.

Academic Information 
Being an integrated secondary school, AMKSS offers three academic streams, namely the four-year Express course, as well as the Normal Course, comprising Normal (Academic) and Normal (Technical) academic tracks.

O Level Express Course 
The Express Course is a nationwide four-year programme that leads up to the Singapore-Cambridge GCE Ordinary Level examination.

Normal Course 
The Normal Course is a nationwide 4-year programme leading to the Singapore-Cambridge GCE Normal Level examination, which runs either the Normal (Academic) curriculum or Normal (Technical) curriculum, abbreviated as N(A) and N(T) respectively.

Normal (Academic) Course 
In the Normal (Academic) course, students offer 5-8 subjects in the Singapore-Cambridge GCE Normal Level examination. Compulsory subjects include:
 English Language
 Mother Tongue Language
 Mathematics
 Combined Humanities
A 5th year leading to the Singapore-Cambridge GCE Ordinary Level examination is available to N(A) students who perform well in their Singapore-Cambridge GCE Normal Level examination. Students can move from one course to another based on their performance and the assessment of the school principal and teachers.

Normal (Technical) Course 
The Normal (Technical) course prepares students for a technical-vocational education at the Institute of Technical Education. Students will offer 5-7 subjects in the Singapore-Cambridge GCE Normal Level examination. The curriculum is tailored towards strengthening students’ proficiency in English and Mathematics. Students take English Language, Mathematics, Basic Mother Tongue and Computer Applications as compulsory subjects.

Co-curricular activities
The school offers a total of 19 extra-curricular activities, labelled as co-curricular activities (CCAs) by the Ministry of Education. These include sports, uniformed groups, performing arts and clubs. Several have been able to do well in outside competition and bring glory to the school.

The school's English drama club has been able to attain good results in the Singapore Youth Festival Arts Presentation, attaining Distinction and Accomplishment in the 2017 and 2015 competitions, and Silver in 2011 and 2013. Its table tennis team has also done very well, attaining the fourth place in the South School Interschool Table Tennis C Division in 2016 and 2017.

Notable alumni
 Celest Chong: Singer and actress
 Ong Soh Khim: Nominated Member of Parliament, 2005-2006

See also
 Education in Singapore

References

External links
 Official website
 "School water not to blame", The New Paper, Singapore, 29 September 2006.
 Ang Mo Kio Secondary School Drama and Debating Society

Secondary schools in Singapore
Schools in Ang Mo Kio
Educational institutions established in 1979
1979 establishments in Singapore